"Contact" is a 1978 disco single by Edwin Starr. The hook line is in the chorus, "Eye to eye, contact".

The single was #1 on the disco chart for one week, early in 1979. It also crossed over to the Billboard Hot 100, becoming his highest charting pop single in seven years, peaking at #65. "Contact" also made the Top 20 on the R&B Charts, peaking at #13. The song found more success in the UK, where it was a Top Ten hit, peaking at #6, in early 1979 (it would also earn Edwin a silver disc for sales in excess of 250,000 copies, along with the very first silver 12" award in recognition of sales over 100,000 copies). It proved to be his second best performance on the UK Charts, beaten only by his #3 smash "War" in 1970. His follow-up single, "H.A.P.P.Y. Radio", was also a UK hit, making it to #9 in mid-1979.

Charts

References

1978 singles
Edwin Starr songs
Disco songs
1978 songs
Songs written by Edwin Starr
20th Century Fox Records singles